The Oberstaufen Cup is a defunct professional tennis tournament played on outdoor red clay courts. It has been part of the Association of Tennis Professionals (ATP) Challenger Tour. It was held annually in Oberstaufen, Germany, from 1992 until 2014.

Past finals

Singles

Doubles

External links
Official website
ITF Search

 
ATP Challenger Tour
Clay court tennis tournaments
Tennis tournaments in Germany